Caroline Brown may refer to:

Caroline Brown (bowls) (born 1980), Scottish bowler
Caroline Brown (cellist) (1953–2018), English cellist
Caroline Brown, pseudonym of American author Caroline Virginia Krout (1852–1931)

See also
Carolyn Brown (disambiguation)
Carrie Brown (disambiguation)